Van Hulssen Islands is a group of about ten small islands, of which Van Hulssen Island is the largest, lying  north of Pila Island in Holme Bay. The islands were mapped by Norwegian cartographers from air photos taken by the Lars Christensen Expedition, 1936–37, and included as part of a group called "Ytterskjera." They were remapped by ANARE (Australian National Antarctic Research Expeditions), 1954–62, and named after the largest island in the group.

See also 
 List of Antarctic and subantarctic islands

Islands of Mac. Robertson Land